In geography, the centroid of the two-dimensional shape of a region of the Earth's surface (projected radially to sea level or onto a geoid surface) is known as its geographic centre or geographical centre or (less commonly) gravitational centre. Informally, determining the centroid is often described as finding the point upon which the shape (cut from a uniform plane) would balance. This method is also sometimes described as the "gravitational method".

One example of a refined approach using an azimuthal equidistant projection, also potentially incorporating an iterative process, was described by Peter A. Rogerson in 2015. The abstract says "the new method minimizes the sum of squared great circle distances from all points in the region to the center". However, as that property is also true of a centroid (of area), this aspect is effectively just different terminology for determining the centroid.

In 2019, New Zealand's GNS Science also used an iterative approach (and a variety of different projections) when determining a centre position for New Zealand's Extended Continental Shelf.

However, other methods have also been proposed or used to determine the centres of various countries and regions. These include:

 centroid of volume (incorporating elevations into calculations), instead of the more usual centroid of area as described above.
 centre point of a bounding box completely enclosing the area. While relatively easy to determine, a centre point calculated using this method will generally also vary (relative to the shape of the landmass or region) depending on the orientation of the bounding box to the area under consideration. In this sense it is not a robust method.
 finding the longitude that divides the region into two equal area parts to the east and west, and then similarly the latitude that divides the region into two equal area parts to the north and south. Like the bounding box approach described above this method would not generally locate precisely the same point if the same shaped region was oriented differently.

As noted in a United States Geological Survey document, "There is no generally accepted definition of geographic center, and no completely satisfactory method for determining it."

In general, there is room for debate around various details such as whether or not to include islands and similarly, large bodies of water, how best to handle the curvature of the Earth (a more significant factor with larger regions) and closely related to that issue, which map projection to use.

Notable geographical centres
Geographical centre of Earth
Axis mundi
Omphalos of Delphi

Geographic centres in Africa
Geographic Centre of Uganda (Amolatar Monument)

Geographic centres in Asia
Geographical midpoints of Asia, in China or Russia
Geographical centre of India
Zero Mile Stone (Nagpur)
Geographic center of Iran
 Geographic centre of Sri Lanka
Geographical centre of the Korean Peninsula
Geographical centre of the Philippines
Geographical centre of the Russian Federation
Geographical centre of the Soviet Union
Geographic center of Taiwan

Geographic centres in Europe
Geographical midpoint of Europe
Geographical centre of Austria
Geographic center of Belarus
Geographical centre of Belgium
Geographical centre of Estonia
Geographical centre of Germany
 Central Germany (geography)
Geographical centre of Hungary
Geographical centre of Ireland
Geographical centre of Lithuania
Geographical centre of Norway
Geographical centre of Poland
Geographical center of Romania
Geographical centre of the Russian Federation
Geographical centre of Serbia
Geographical centre of Slovenia
Geographical centre of the Soviet Union
Geographical center of Sweden
Geographical centre of Switzerland
Centre points of the United Kingdom
Geographical centre of Great Britain
Centre points of counties of the United Kingdom
Geographic centre of England
Geographical centre of Scotland
Geographic centre of Wales

Geographic centres in North America
Geographic center of North America
Geographic centre of Canada
Geographic center of the United States
List of geographic centers of the United States

Geographic centres in Oceania
Centre points of Australia
Geographic centre of New Zealand

Geographic centres in South America
Geographical Center of South America
Geographical Center of Colombia

See also
Extremes on Earth
Pole of inaccessibility
Center of population

References

External links